Helen Anne Park, known as Anna Park (used throughout for consistency) or Ann Park, was born in 1769 at Moffat, Scotland. She was thought to have been the daughter of Joseph Park, an Edinburgh coachmaker, and Jean Dick. However, recent research has shown that she was actually the daughter of Walter Park and Elizabeth Blacklock. Margaret Ewing nee Park, a onetime landlady of 'The Globe', was her sister and she worked there as a barmaid. Anna bore the poet Robert Burns an illegitimate child named Elizabeth 'Betty' Burns as a result of an adulterous affair.

Life and character
Anna was a niece of Mrs Jean Hyslop (born Jean or Jane Maxwell), who had been the landlady at the Globe Tavern in Dumfries before Anna's sister Margaret Ewing nee Park took over. Anna had five sisters in all, namely Margaret, Janet, Betty, Elizabeth and Janet. Anna's father was a servant and later a chaise driver.

Anna first met Burns when she was only 21 and, following an adulterous affair with the poet, gave birth on 31 March 1791 to Robert Burns's daughter Elizabeth 'Betty' Burns just a few days before his wife Jean Armour gave birth to his legitimate son William Nicol Burns. Anna Park is said to have given Elizabeth to Burns in 1793 when she was seeking a position as a domestic servant. The birth is thought to have taken place in Leith where she was sent so that the birth would not lead to Burns being the subject of scandal at this stage.

One other tradition is that Anna actually died whilst giving birth to Elizabeth or soon after, and Maria Riddell wrote that Jean Armour was a generous person for having taken in an illegitimate child "... who had lost her mother." She certainly vanishes from history in the early 1790s.

Brown records that two of Anna's grandsons were at the 1859 Glasgow Anniversary Celebrations, sons therefore of her daughter Betty and John Thomson.

Association with Robert Burns

Burns first met Anna Park at the Globe Tavern in Dumfries, where she worked as a barmaid. She was Burns's "Anna of the gowden locks" although when the song was first published in 1799 the subject of the song had "raven locks."

Anna may also have been the inspiration of "Yestreen, I had a pint of wine," the lovesong that Burns considered his best. In his totally unrepentant postscript the poet wrote:

Very little primary evidence survives about the relationship between Burns and Anna Park who vanishes from the records after their child 'Betty' was born. Local tradition relates that Anna "had other pretty ways to render herself agreeable to the customers at the inn than the serving of wine", however no real evidence exists to confirm this.

Some confusion exists over Anna Parks first name and surname in the various sources, with variations such as Ann Hyslop, Helen Anne Hislop, Etc. The variation Helen Hyslop adds to the confusion as a 'beauty' of this name from Moffat is said to have had an affair and a daughter, also Helen, by the poet.

A letter of 1792 to Maria Riddell has led to speculation that she had been asked by Burns to carry out a task regarding Elizabeth, Ann's daughter.

Janet Elsie-May Coom, the great, great, great granddaughter of Robert Burns, through Anna Park, was made an honorary member of the Irvine Burns Club in January 2009.

See also

Jean Armour
Lesley Baillie
Alison Begbie
Nelly Blair
Isabella Burns
May Cameron
Mary Campbell (Highland Mary)
Jenny Clow
Helen Hyslop
Nelly Kilpatrick
Jessie Lewars
Anne Rankine
Isabella Steven
Peggy Thompson
Elizabeth 'Betty' Burns
Elizabeth Bishop (Burns)

References
Notes

Sources

 Begg, Robert Burns (1891). Memoir of Isobel Burns. Privately published.
 Brown, Hilton (1949). There was a Lad. London : Hamish Hamilton.
 Douglas, William Scott (Edit.) 1938. The Kilmarnock Edition of the Poetical Works of Robert Burns. Glasgow : The Scottish Daily Express.
 Greenshields, G.C. & I.R. (2020). Anna Park and the Hyslops of the Globe Inn. Burns Chronicle. V.129. 
 Hecht, Hans (1936). Robert Burns. The Man and His Work. London : William Hodge.
 Hill, John C. Rev. (1961). The Love Songs and Heroines of Robert Burns. London : J. M. Dent.
 Mackay, James (2004). Burns. A Biography of Robert Burns. Darvel : Alloway Publishing. .
 McIntyre, Ian (2001). Robert Burns. A Life. New York : Welcome Rain Publishers. .
 Scott, Patrick (2020). A Burns Puzzler:What Colour Was Anna's Hair?. Burns Chronicle. v.129.
 Westwood, Peter J. (1996). Jean Armour. Mrs Robert Burns. An illustrated Biography.  Dumfries : Creedon Publications. ISBN

External links
Photograph of Betty Park or Burns
Anna Park's daughter Betty and family

Robert Burns
18th-century Scottish women
1779 births
Year of death unknown